Still Smokin or Still Smokin' may refer to:

Still Smokin (film), a 1983 American comedy film by Cheech and Chong
Still Smokin (Lil Rob album), 2000, or the title song
Still Smokin, a 1992 album by The Marshall Tucker Band
Still Smokin''', a 2012 album by Brownsville StationStill Smokin, an unauthorized release of the Doobie Brothers On Our Way Up"Still Smokin'", a song by Kottonmouth Kings from Hidden Stash III''